Divide Mountain is a  summit located in Denali National Park and Preserve, in the Alaska Range, in the U.S. state of Alaska. It is a landmark  in the Toklat River valley visible to tourists from the park road. This mountain's local descriptive name was first shown on a 1916 U.S. Geological Survey map.

Climate

Based on the Köppen climate classification, Divide Mountain is located in a subarctic climate zone with long, cold, snowy winters, and mild summers. Temperatures can drop below −20 °C with wind chill factors below −30 °C. Precipitation runoff from the mountain drains into the Toklat River, which in turn is part of the Tanana River drainage basin. The months May through June offer the most favorable weather for climbing or viewing.

See also

List of mountain peaks of Alaska
Geology of Alaska

References

Gallery

External links
 Weather forecast: Divide Mountain
 Summit panorama photo: National Park Service

Alaska Range
Mountains of Denali Borough, Alaska
Mountains of Denali National Park and Preserve
Mountains of Alaska
North American 1000 m summits